Wumpscut (stylised as :wumpscut:) is a gothic influenced electro-industrial music project from Germany. It was founded in May 1991 by Bavarian disc jockey Rudolf "Rudy" Ratzinger (born 3 June 1966).

History 
Rudy Ratzinger is the creative force behind Wumpscut, occasionally employing the help of guest artists (such as Aleta Welling, P·A·L, Selene etc.), although such collaborations were minimal in scope. Ratzinger cites the influence of such bands as Leæther Strip as his reason for making the transfer from DJing to recording music: "I was a DJ for several years and was tired of offering the audience only alien stuff. The first Leæther Strip works were responsible for trying something on my own."

First works performed by Wumpscut dates back to the early 1990s when Rudy Ratzinger started to play music in Bavarian club houses and in Southern Germany. In a 1997 interview, Rudy Ratzinger reveals that "Pornography" and "War Combattery" were his first two songs in EBM, those two four-minute songs are to be found on Defcon, the first demo issued by Wumpscut in late 1991. Yet, only "Pornography" was picked for reappearance on Blutkind (although a remix of War Combattery surfaced on the Mesner Tracks re-release EP which was released before). According to Rudy, "War Combattery" was a great hit in club houses: "[It] was a very big success in the clubs in Southern Germany."
    
The release of the song "Soylent Green", which is named after the 1973 movie and also contains audio samples from the German dubbed version, first attracted attention to Wumpscut. Since its release in 1993, it has become a frequently played song at events and clubs in the goth and industrial subcultures, in Germany, UK and the United States. The 1997 album, Embryodead made an appearance at #20 on the CMJ RPM chart in the U.S.

Wumpscut produced elaborate box set releases including limited versions of CD or LP releases with additional and bonus material (bonus tracks, "liquid soylent" energy drinks, posters, pins, stickers, bags, flags, etc.). Wumpscut albums were reissued with variant artworks, remastering and track listings. Standalone merchandise such as baseball caps, coffee mugs and t-shirts were also made available for purchase.

Rudy Ratzinger has to date released seventeen studio albums plus a number of compilations: demos, compilation tracks, and remixes from deleted singles and EPs. The sixteenth Wumpscut album, Wüterich, was released on 25 March 2016 on the Metropolis label. He released a "best of" album titled Innerfire on 5 May 2017, while also announcing that Wumpscut would no longer be producing or making any new music on his Facebook and Twitter accounts.

On 5 November 2020, a new album entitled "Fledermavs 303" was announced with the release of a teaser track through the Wumpscut page on Bandcamp, presumably implying that Rudy has returned to producing music again.

On 2 April 2021, a new album entitled "Fledermavs 303" was released.

Record labels 
Ratzinger started his own record label, Beton Kopf Media, in 1995, used exclusively to release Wumpscut material to the European market. In 1996, he started the label Mental Ulcer Forges which lapsed in the early 2000s, then relaunched in 2006. The label released albums by the following bands: Remyl, Noisex, B-Ton-K, Yendri and F/A/V. Rudy also managed the label Fleisskoma with Karl Kimmerl (B-Ton-K), which has released work by the electronic band Press to Transmit.

Live performance 
Despite the project's popularity in the electro-industrial genre, Wumpscut is a studio-only project and never tours.  When asked for his reason behind this decision, Rudy commented: "I cannot come up to my self-set level."

Discography

See also 

 List of electro-industrial bands

References

External links 
 List of releases
 Wumpscut at Myspace
 

Electro-industrial music groups
German industrial music groups
German electronic music groups
Musical groups established in 1991
Metropolis Records artists
1991 establishments in Germany